Badla Aurat Ka is a Hindi-language action drama film directed and produced by Thakur Tapasvi. This film was released on 16 February 2001 under the banner of Tapasvi Productions House.

Plot
The plot of the movie revolves with a life of an innocent village girl who is tied to bed spread eagle and gang raped by three goons. Those powerful trios smash her family, kill her father and friends. The girls is imprisoned for false charge of murder. Now she come out from jail and starts to take revenge on them.

Cast
 Ranjeet
 Raza Murad
 Sahila Chadha
 Manik Irani
 Bharat Kapoor
 Mahesh Raj
 Huma Khan
 Aqbal Dhani

References

External links
 

2001 films
2001 action films
2000s Hindi-language films
Indian action films
Indian rape and revenge films
Indian films about revenge
Hindi-language action films